Edmund Casimir Szoka (September 14, 1927 – August 20, 2014) was an American prelate of the Roman Catholic Church. Until 2006, he was President of the Pontifical Commission for Vatican City State and President of the Governorate of Vatican City State, having previously served as Bishop of Gaylord from 1971 to 1981 and Archbishop of Detroit from 1981 to 1990. Szoka was elevated to the cardinalate in 1988.

Early life
Edmund Casimir Szoka was born in Grand Rapids, Michigan, to Casimir and Mary (née Wolgat) Szoka, Polish immigrants. He has an older sister, Irene, and moved with his family in the early 1930s to Muskegon, where he did his primary studies at St. Michael School. Attracted to life as a priest at an early age, Szoka attended St. Joseph's Seminary in Grand Rapids, 
Sacred Heart Major Seminary in Detroit for his junior and senior years, and then St. John's Provincial Seminary in Plymouth, Michigan to study theology.

Priesthood
On June 5, 1954, he was ordained to the priesthood by Bishop Thomas Noa in St. Peter's Cathedral in Marquette, Michigan. He did pastoral work in Manistique. From 1957 to 1959, he studied canon law at the Pontifical Urbaniana University or the Pontifical Lateran University in Rome. He then became secretary to Bishop Noa of Marquette, whom he accompanied to the first session of the Second Vatican Council in 1962. During this period he also served as chaplain at St. Mary’s Hospital and K. I. Sawyer Air Force Base.  Upon returning to the United States, Szoka did pastoral and curial work, including serving as an official of the matrimonial tribunal in Marquette until 1971. He was raised to the rank of Honorary Prelate of His Holiness on November 14, 1963, by Pope Paul VI.

Episcopal ministry

Bishop of Gaylord
Szoka was appointed the first Bishop of Gaylord on June 11, 1971. He received his episcopal consecration on the following July 20 from Cardinal John Francis Dearden, with Bishops Charles Salatka and Joseph McKinney serving as co-consecrators. A year later, the Bishops of the 4th pastoral region of the National Conference of Catholic Bishops (NCCB) elected him president for the period of 1972-77. At the same time, he was treasurer and secretary of the Episcopal Conference of Michigan. As Bishop of Gaylord, Szoka improved the annulment consideration process, drawing from his experience in the matrimonial tribunal in Marquette.

Archbishop of Detroit
On March 21, 1981, he was promoted to be third Metropolitan Archbishop of Detroit (eighth bishop) by Pope John Paul II.
After 1981, he also served as president of the Administration Council for the provincial seminary of St. John in Plymouth, Michigan, and of SS. Cyril and Methodius Seminary near Orchard Lake Village, Michigan. He was also a president of the board of directors of the Episcopal Conference of Michigan, member of the executive committee of The Catholic University of America, president of the Committee for University Relations, Administrator of the National Sanctuary of the Immaculate Conception, treasurer of the NCCB, and served on committees within the Conference for: human values, bishops, dioceses and provinces, and economic affairs. He faced challenges of finance and enforcing Church discipline, and welcomed John Paul II to Detroit in 1987 during his tenure as Archbishop.

In 1983, he dealt with the case of Agnes Mary Mansour, a nun and the director of the Michigan Department of Community Health who worked to continue abortion services in Michigan. Szoka had given his permission for Mansour to serve the state but said she must oppose publicly funded abortion. Mansour believed abortion was tragic but should be legal, and she continued disbursing Medicaid abortion funds. Szoka appealed to Mansour's superiors in the Sisters of Mercy but the order supported her stance. Szoka referred the case to the Vatican, and Bishop Anthony Bevilacqua resolved it by ordering Mansour to resign either her government post or her orders. Mansour left the sisterhood.

He was created Cardinal-Priest of Ss. Andrea e Gregorio al Monte Celio by John Paul II in the consistory of June 28, 1988.

Rev. Joseph Gembela, pastor of St. Malachy's parish, noted that Szoka received a good deal of unjust criticism when he closed thirty churches in Detroit during 1989-90; many of which were sparsely attended. The first large-scale closing of Catholic churches in a major U.S. city, other dioceses with changing demographics have since followed suit.

Roman Curia
Resigning as Archbishop of Detroit on April 28, 1990, Szoka had been named President of the Prefecture for the Economic Affairs of the Holy See on January 22, 1990, and served as such to October 14, 1997. In this position, he helped manage the Vatican's financial affairs.

On October 14, 1997, Cardinal Szoka was named President of the Governorate of Vatican City State, and on February 22, 2001, President of the Pontifical Commission for Vatican City State. Within the Roman Curia his membership included: Secretariat of State (second section), and Causes of Saints, Bishops, Evangelization of Peoples (Congregatio de Propaganda Fide), Clergy, Institutes of Consecrated Life and Societies of Apostolic Life (congregations). He submitted his resignation to John Paul II in 2002, at the Church's mandatory retirement age of 75, but was requested to continue working. During his rare spare time, Szoka enjoyed walking through the Vatican Gardens.

Szoka was one of the cardinal electors who participated in the 2005 papal conclave that selected Pope Benedict XVI. As Governor of the Vatican, it fell to Szoka, along with Secretary of State Angelo Sodano and Camerlengo Eduardo Martínez Somalo, to prepare for the cardinal electors' housing at the Domus Sanctae Marthae.

Retirement
It was announced on June 22, 2006, that his resignation had been accepted by Pope Benedict and that he would officially step down on September 15, 2006; he maintained all curial memberships until age 80. On what he would do after retirement, Szoka said he was interested in travel, writing, studying the Church Fathers, and continuing to provide priestly assistance to Detroit.
Cardinal Szoka had fond memories of Pope John Paul II, especially in regard to his travels to Poland and to the United States: Cardinal Szoka lived in Northville, Michigan.

Szoka died on August 20, 2014, of natural causes, at Providence Park Hospital in Novi, Michigan.

See also

References

Sources
 
 

|-

1927 births
2014 deaths
Presidents of the Pontifical Commission for Vatican City State
Pontifical Urban University alumni
20th-century American cardinals
Roman Catholic archbishops of Detroit
21st-century American cardinals
Economic history of the Holy See
Clergy from Grand Rapids, Michigan
People from Muskegon, Michigan
People from Schoolcraft County, Michigan
American people of Polish descent
Cardinals created by Pope John Paul II
Roman Catholic bishops of Gaylord
Catholic University of America people
Members of the Congregation for the Causes of Saints
Members of the Congregation for Bishops
Members of the Congregation for the Evangelization of Peoples
Members of the Congregation for the Clergy
Members of the Congregation for Institutes of Consecrated Life and Societies of Apostolic Life